The 2012 Brabantse Pijl was the 52nd edition of the Brabantse Pijl cycle race and was held on 11 April 2012. The race started in Leuven and finished in Overijse. The race was won by Thomas Voeckler.

General classification

References

2012
Brabantse Pijl